Hassouna Mosbahi (born 1950 in Dhehibat, Kairouan) is a Tunisian author, literary critic and freelance journalist.

Biography 
Hassouna Mosbahi was born in 1950 in the village of Dhehibat in the governorate of Kairouan, Tunisia, and studied French at the Tunis University.

He suffered persecution at the hands of the government of Habib Bourghiba and so sought refuge in Europe, moving to Munich, Germany in 1985. He returned to Tunisia in 2004.

He has published four collections of short stories and six novels and has been translated into German and English. He has also published dozens of translations of French literary works into Arabic.

His work has won several literary prizes, including the Munich Fiction Prize (for the German translation of his novel Tarshish Hallucination), and the 2016 Mohamed Zefzef Prize for Fiction (for his novel A Tunisian Tale). In 2010 he refused a "Judges' Choice" prize from the Prix Littéraires COMAR D’OR for his novel Ramād al-ḥayāh (Ashes of life), for what he described as "reasons he will keep to himself".

He currently lives in Hammamat, Tunisia.

Prizes 

 Toucan Fiction Prize in Munich, 2000, for German translation of Halwasāt Taršīš (Tarshish Hallucination)
 Mohamed Zefzef Prize for Fiction, 2016
 Prix Littéraires COMAR D’OR, "Judges' Choice", 2010 (Refused by author)

Political Views and Controversy 
Mosbahi has been vocal in his opposition to the 2011 Tunisian revolution in interviews and speeches, as well as in his 2015 novel ʼAšwāk wa-yāsamīn (Thorns and Jasmine). This political stance has been sharply criticized.

Selected works

Novels 

 Miḥan tūnisiyya (Tunisian afflictions), 2017
 Baḥṯan ʻan al-saʻāda (Searching for happiness), 2017
 ʼAšwāk wa-yāsamīn (Thorns and jasmine), 2015
 La nasbahou fi enahri maratayn  , 2020
 Yatīm al-dahr (Orphan of an era), 2012
 Ramād al-ḥayāh (Ashes of life), 2009
 Hikāyat tūnisiyya (A Tunisian tale), 2008. English translation 2012 by Max Weiss.
 Nuwwārat al-diflā (Oleander), 2004. German translation (Der grüne Esel) 2013 by Regina Karachouli.
 Wadāʻan Rawzālī (A farewell to Rosalie), 2001. German translation (Adieu Rosalie) 2004 by Erdmute Heller.
 al-ʼAḵirūn (The Others), 1998
 Halwasāt Taršīš (Tarshish hallucination), 1995. German translation (Rückkehr nach Tarschisch) by Regina Karachouli.

Short Stories 

 Haḏayān fī al-ṣaḥrāʼ (Dessert mirages), 2014
 al-Sulaḥfāh (The Tortoise), 1997, 2000
 Hikāyat junūn ibnat ʻammī Hanniya (A story of my cousin Hanniya's insanity), 1986
 Laylat al-ḡurabāʼ (Night of strangers), 1997

References 

Living people
1950 births
Tunisian short story writers
Tunisian novelists
21st-century Tunisian writers